Elmer Ottis Wooton (19 September 1865 – 1945), was an American botanist, professor of chemistry and botany at New Mexico State College from 1890 to 1911, assistant curator at the National Herbarium in 1910, and employed by the US Department of Agriculture from 1911 to 1935. The species Astragalus wootonii and Cheilanthes wootonii were named after him.

Notes

Sources
 Allred, Kelly (2008) "E. O. Wooton: New Mexico's Pioneer Botanist" Rangelands 30(5): pp. 11–17
 Spellenberg, Ricard (7 May 1997) "The NMSU Herbarium (NMC)" The New Mexico Botanist Issue number 5
 

American botanists
People from New Mexico
People from Kokomo, Indiana
1865 births
1945 deaths